ITSA may refer to:

Indian Telecommunication Service Officers` Association in India
 Instituto Tecnológico Superior Aeronáutico in Ecuador
 Intelligent Transportation Society of America, an advocate for Intelligent Transportation Systems in the United States
Information Technology Services Agency an executive agency of the Department of Social Security in the UK
ITSA Film Festival (Imagination, Talent, Shorts, Animation) - a Film Festival in Sonora, California